Iryna Sysoyenko (born March 6, 1982) is a Ukrainian politician and lawyer. She is a former National Deputy of the Verkhovna Rada (Parliament of Ukraine) representing the Samopomich (Self Reliance) party.

Early life and education
Iryna Sysoienko was born on March 6, 1982, in Mykolaiv, Ukraine. She studied law at the International Solomon University, graduated in 2003. She continued her studies at the National Academy of Internal Affairs from 2003 to 2004, and at the Intellectual Property Institute in 2003-2005.

Career
From 2005 to 2009, Sysoienko worked as a chief specialist of judicial management department of Ministry of Science and Education in Ukraine, where she was charged with the duty of protecting intellectual property rights in Ukraine. In 2009, she became the General Director of Patent law agency Brand Group. From 2014 she has become Co-founder and General Director at the law firm Babych, Sysoienko and Partners.

In 2014, Sysoienko became a lecturer in Civil Law at Kyiv Law University of the Academy of Arts in Ukraine. She is the author of numerous articles and publications on copyright, intellectual property, unfair competition, protection of rights themes and medical law. Sysoienko is co-founder and chairman of the Charity Fund for the Protection of Medical Workers' Rights. She is a member of the Advocate Association of Ukraine, the Ukrainian Bar Association.

In 2014, she was elected to the Verkhovna Rada.

Sysoienko again took part in the July 2019 Ukrainian parliamentary election, this time for the party Strength and Honor. But in the election the party won 3.82%, not enough to clear the 5% election threshold and thus no parliamentary seats.

Career in academia 
Sysoienko was a research fellow at the Kyiv University of Law of the National Academy of Sciences of Ukraine and a competitor of Civil Law at the Kyiv University of Law of the National Academy of Sciences of Ukraine. She is the author of numerous articles and publications on copyright, intellectual property, unfair competition, and medical law.

References

External links
 

1982 births
Living people
Eighth convocation members of the Verkhovna Rada
Military personnel from Mykolaiv
21st-century Ukrainian lawyers
Self Reliance (political party) politicians
21st-century Ukrainian women politicians
Ukrainian women lawyers
21st-century women lawyers
Women members of the Verkhovna Rada